A star candidate refers to a high-profile individual who has been recruited as a candidate by a political party. Star candidates have usually excelled in fields outside politics such as academia, business, entertainment, the media, journalism and/or sports. They are also either retired high-profile politicians who have been lured back into politics or a big-city mayor or provincial premier/state governor who has been convinced to enter federal politics, or former politicians that have been lured to run at another level to attain high-profile positions at that level.

See also
Paper candidate

References

Political terminology in Canada
Elections in the United States
Political terms in the United Kingdom
Elections
Elections terminology
Celebrity concepts